Ulrich (died 27 January 990) was abbot of the Abbey of Saint Gall from 984 to 990.

Life 
Not much is known about Ulrich. In 956/57, he possibly held the office of Hospitarius. He became abbot of Saint Gall in November 984. He is not mentioned in any records.

Works 
Ulrich is supposed to have completed the construction and interior works commenced by his predecessor Ymmo.

Notes and references 

Year of birth unknown
990 deaths
Abbots of Saint Gall